Joni T. Johnson (1934–1988) was an American painter from Swayzee, Indiana.

Education

Johnson went to Arsenal Technical High School in Indianapolis and attended the John Herron Art Institute.

Career

From the 1950s through the late '70s, Johnson worked in Indianapolis, where she displayed and sold her art in several galleries, and was a founder of the Talbott Street Art Fair.  She had a mini-retrospective in 1977 in the Art Pavilion at L.S. Ayres. Watercolor was her primary medium, and she is best known for her representations of children and the female figure.

For a short time, Johnson lived and worked in Chicago, where she studied with Charles E. Burchfield.

Two of Johnson's paintings hang in the White House East Room, and her works have hung in 27 countries.  Her paintings, always signed J.T. Johnson, have been owned by Katharine Hepburn, Harry Belafonte, Lana Turner, Joel Grey, Vincent Price, Connie Myers, Frances Myers, Jan Wilhere, and Constance Vinson

References
Congressional Record, March 21, 1989
The Indianapolis News, June 24, 1988. Sec. A. p. 13, c. 2
The Indianapolis Star, June 18, 1988. Sec. D. p. 1, c. 6
The Artists Bluebook: 34,000 North American Artists to March 2005 AskART.com Inc., Dunbier, Lonnie Pierson (Editor)

External links
Johnson on Ask Art
Johnson on Antique Helper

American women painters
Herron School of Art and Design alumni
1934 births
1988 deaths
Painters from Indiana
20th-century American women artists